Atractus snethlageae is a species of snake in the family Colubridae. The species can be found in Brazil, Suriname, Colombia, Bolivia, Peru, Ecuador, and  Argentina.

References 

Atractus
Reptiles of Ecuador
Snakes of South America
Reptiles described in 1983